Zayd Muse Farah (born 12 January 2000) is a professional footballer who plays as a defender for Bayswater City, on loan from Perth Glory. Born in Australia, he represents the Somalia national team.

Club career
Farah made his debut for Perth Glory Youth, making 22 appearances during the 2018 Football West season. During his time at Perth Glory, Farah also played for Bayswater City.

International career
On 15 June 2021, Farah made his debut for Somalia, in a 1–0 friendly loss against Djibouti.

References

2000 births
Living people
Association football defenders
Perth Glory FC players
Somalian footballers
Australian soccer players
Somalia international footballers
National Premier Leagues players
Bayswater City SC players